Lane Chandler (born Robert Clinton Oakes, June 4, 1899 – September 14, 1972) was an American actor specializing mainly in Westerns.

Biography

Early life
Chandler was raised on a ranch near Culbertson, Montana, the son of a horse rancher. The family relocated to Helena, Montana, when he was a youngster, and he graduated from high school there. He briefly attended Montana Wesleyan College (which later merged and became part of Rocky Mountain College), but quit to drive a tour bus at Yellowstone National Park.

Career
In the early 1920s he moved to Los Angeles, California, and started working as an auto mechanic. His real-life experiences growing up on a horse ranch landed bit parts for him in westerns from 1925, for Paramount Pictures. Studio executives suggested changing his name to Lane Chandler, and as such he began achieving leading roles opposite stars like Clara Bow, Greta Garbo, Betty Bronson and Esther Ralston. His first lead role was in The Legion of the Condemned.

As a silent film star Chandler performed well, but when talkies arrived he was cast more in supporting roles, as in The Great Mike of 1944. He starred in a few low-budget westerns in the 1930s, but was more often cast as the leading man's partner, or saddle pal, or a sheriff or army officer.  Many of his films featured alliterative titles such as Riders of the Rio (1931), Primrose Path (1931), The Cheyenne Cyclone (1931), The Hurricane Horseman (1931), Battling Buckaroo (1932), The Wyoming Whirlwind (1932), The Reckless Rider (1932), and The Texas Tornado (1932); all but one of these films starred Chandler top-billed with his name above the title. With the advent of television Chandler began making appearance on numerous series, often in Westerns such as The Lone Ranger, The Adventures of Wild Bill Hickok, Lawman, Have Gun – Will Travel, Rawhide, Maverick, Cheyenne, and Gunsmoke (as “Trumbull” in the S7E10 titled “Indian Ford” in 1961); many of these TV series appearances were bit parts with no billing at all. He continued acting on TV and in films through 1966, retiring comfortably due to his holdings in both residential and commercial properties.

He died in Los Angeles of heart disease in 1972, aged 73.

Selected filmography

The Last Outlaw (1927) – Rancher (uncredited)
Open Range (1927) – Tex Smith
Love and Learn (1928) – Anthony Cowles
Red Hair (1928) (with Clara Bow) – Robert Lennon
The Legion of the Condemned (1928) (with Fay Wray and Gary Cooper) – Charles Holabird
The Big Killing (1928) – George Hicks
The First Kiss (1928) (with Fay Wray and Gary Cooper) – William Talbot
The Wolf of Wall Street (1929) – (uncredited)
The Studio Murder Mystery (1929) – Bill Martin (uncredited)
The Single Standard (1929) (with Greta Garbo) – Ding Stuart
The Forward Pass (1929) – "Assistant Coach Kane"
Firebrand Jordan (1930) – Firebrand Jordan
The Lightning Express (1930, Serial) – Jack Venable
Rough Waters (1930) – Cal Morton
 Beyond the Law (1930) – Jack-Knife
Under Texas Skies (1930) – Singer Martin – Secret Service Agent
Riders of the Rio (1931)
 Primrose Path (1931)
 The Cheyenne Cyclone (1931)
 The Hurricane Horseman (1931)
 Guns for Hire (1932)
 Battling Buckaroo (1932)
 The Reckless Rider (1932)
 The Wyoming Whirlwind (1932)
 Lawless Valley (1932)
 The Texas Tornado (1932)
Sagebrush Trail (1933) (with John Wayne and Yakima Canutt)
 Via Pony Express (1933)
 War of the Range (1933)
 Trouble Busters (1933)
 The Outlaw Tamer (1935)
 Idaho Kid (1936)
 The Magnificent Brute (1936)
 Winds of the Wasteland (1936) (with John Wayne)
Heroes of the Alamo (1937) – Davy Crockett
Come On, Rangers (1938)
Flash Gordon's Trip to Mars (1938, Serial) – Flight Commander [Chs. 2–3]
 Two Gun Justice (1938)
The Man in the Iron Mask (1939)
 The Taming of the West (1939)
Hi-Yo Silver (1940)
 Wild Horse Rustlers (1943)
 Law of the Saddle (1943)
 Rustlers' Hideout (1944)
 Terror Trail (1946)
Behind Prison Walls (1946)
Gunning for Vengeance (1946)
The Hawk of Wild River (1946)
The Vigilantes Return (1947)
 Cattle Queen (1951)
Thunder Over the Plains (1953) (with Randolph Scott and Phyllis Kirk)
Border River (1954) (with Joel McCrea and Yvonne De Carlo)
Quantrill's Raiders (1958)

References

External links

 
 

1899 births
1972 deaths
20th-century American male actors
American male film actors
American male silent film actors
Male Western (genre) film actors
Male actors from Montana
Male actors from South Dakota
People from Helena, Montana
People from Roosevelt County, Montana
Rocky Mountain College alumni